Goose Cove may refer to:

Goose Cove, Hare Bay, Newfoundland and Labrador
Goose Cove, Placentia Bay, Newfoundland and Labrador
Goose Cove, Trinity Bay, Newfoundland and Labrador

See also
Goose Cove East, a town in Newfoundland and Labrador